Musemestre Bamba (born 10 November 1971) is a Congolese former professional footballer who played as a midfielder. He played professionally for Denizlispor in the Süper Lig and for LR Ahlen in the 2. Bundesliga.

References

External links
 
 

Living people
1971 births
Democratic Republic of the Congo footballers
Association football midfielders
Süper Lig players
2. Bundesliga players
Regionalliga players
AS Vita Club players
Denizlispor footballers
VfB Hüls players
Rot Weiss Ahlen players
SV Lippstadt 08 players
SC Verl players
Democratic Republic of the Congo expatriate footballers
Democratic Republic of the Congo expatriate sportspeople in Germany
Expatriate footballers in Germany